"Angelito"  ("Little Angel") is the first single by Don Omar taken from his album King of Kings. It reached number one on the  Billboard Latin Rhythm Airplay, Hot Latin Tracks and Latin Tropical Airplay charts, peaking at number 93 on the Billboard Hot 100. The song won the Video of the Year award at the Premio Lo Nuestro 2007.

Meaning of the song

"Angelito" is one of the most thematic songs in the history of reggaeton, like "Shorty" (by Randy), "Down" (by Rakim & Ken-Y) and "Todo Tiene Final" (by Arcángel). The meaning of the song is that the "angelito" is a girl who contracted AIDS for a revenge and has sex with a stranger, who is death. At the end of the song, the girl finally dies. And has a baby who is a younger DON OMAR so he remembers this when he is older.

That's why the song says: "Amaneció bajo las alas de la muerte, aquellos brazos de hombre que la aprietan fuerte, todavía le late el alma, el corazón no lo siente" [...] "Dos extraños jugando a quererse, en lo oscuro el amor no puede verse, es que tengas la vida de frente es morir o detente" [...] "Esta es la feliz historia de dos enamorados, de dos soñadores, de dos amantes, que permitieron que tan solo un minuto de su vida decidiera el resto de la misma, irónico el momento en el que el amor se convierte en muerte".

Music video
The music video was filmed in Rome, featuring many of the city's historic landmarks directed by David Impelluso.

Charts

Weekly charts

Year-end charts

Sales and certifications

References

2006 singles
Don Omar songs
Spanish-language songs
Songs written by Don Omar
Machete Music singles
2006 songs